The ABA Chandler Robbins Award for Education/Conservation is an award given by the American Birding Association to an individual who has made significant contributions either to the education of birders or to bird conservation and the "management or preservation of habitats on which birds and birding depends."  The award may also recognize efforts in both fields. 

One of five awards presented by the ABA for contributions to ornithology, the award is named in honor of Chandler Robbins, who himself advanced both conservation and education.  Robbins is author of an influential field guide to birds and the architect of the North American Breeding Bird Survey.

The award was first bestowed on Ted Lee Eubanks.

List of recipients
Since the award's inception in 2000, there have been 17 recipients.

See also

 List of ornithology awards

References

Ornithology awards
American Birding Association
Awards established in 2000